John Luca Levee (born 21 February 1997) is a Jamaican  footballer who plays as a midfielder for Dulwich Hamlet.

Club career
Levee started his career at Real Mona, before spending three years with Spanish side Valencia, after finishing as one of the top three performers at a camp. Following his spell with Valencia, Levee had a short spell with Huracán Valencia.

After his time in Spain, Levee moved to the United States to play soccer at Milton Academy. He led the team to a 22-0 unbeaten season and was named boys' soccer player of the year. He committed to playing soccer at the University of Maryland, and made a total of 12 appearances for the university's soccer team, The Terrapins.

Levee returned to Jamaica to sign with Harbour View in 2019.

On 28 January 2022, Levee signed with English National League South side Dulwich Hamlet.

International career
Levee has caps for Jamaica at various youth levels.

He made his full international debut in a 4-1 loss to the United States on 25 March 2021, coming on as a second half substitute for Jamal Lowe.

Career statistics

Club

Notes

International

Honors
 NCAA Men's Division I Soccer Championship:
 Winner (1): 2018

References

External links
 Luca Levee at the University of Maryland

1997 births
Living people
Maryland Terrapins men's soccer players
Jamaican footballers
Jamaican expatriate footballers
Jamaica under-20 international footballers
Jamaica youth international footballers
Jamaica international footballers
Association football midfielders
National Premier League players
National League (English football) players
Valencia CF players
Huracán Valencia CF players
Harbour View F.C. players
Dulwich Hamlet F.C. players
Jamaican expatriate sportspeople in Spain
Jamaican expatriate sportspeople in the United States
Jamaican expatriate sportspeople in England
Expatriate footballers in Spain
Expatriate soccer players in the United States
Expatriate footballers in England